Nigel Collins may refer to:

 Nigel Collins (writer), boxing writer
 Nigel Collins (musician), New Zealand musician, actor and playwright